The Malaysian Siamese or Thai Malaysians are an ethnicity or community who principally resides in Peninsular Malaysia which is a relatively homogeneous cultural region to Southern Burma and Southern Thailand but was separated by the Anglo-Siamese Treaty of 1909 between the United Kingdom and the Kingdom of Siam. The treaty established the modern Malaysia-Thailand Border which starts from Golok River in Kelantan and ends at Padang Besar in Perlis.

Demographics 
In 2000, the national statistics cited 50,211 individuals of Siamese ethnicity in Malaysia. Among these, 38,353 (or 76.4% of them) hold Malaysian citizenship.

Culture 
The Malaysian Siamese community share cultural similarities with the natives who inhabit the Malay Peninsula. Community activities, ethnolinguistic identity and languages spoken by Malaysian Siamese are similar to their brethren in the fourteen provinces of Southern Thailand as well as the southernmost Burmese.

The Malaysian Siamese lead a way of life similar to other Malaysian Malays. Malaysian Siamese still have the strong belief and practices of Buddhism while the Malaysian Malays have adopted Islam since the 14th century. The Malaysian Siamese are well established in the northernmost states of Malaysia, namely Perlis, Kedah, Perak, Penang, Terengganu and Kelantan. One could not differentiate a Malay or a Siamese if they are not speaking their mother tongue. The only distinctive mark among them is their religion and language. Otherwise Malaysian Siamese are like Malays as they also speak fluent local Malay dialects. Majority of Malaysian Siamese can read and write in Thai because there is Thai language learning and teaching in the schools which were established inside the village temples since 1943. They also often follow news in Thailand, watch Thai dramas and listen to Thai music.

The Malaysian Siamese often get patronage from the state governments for their community's well-being. Often, temples are given generous fundings by Thailand's government. Their community are also known for the making of traditional medicine.

Religion 
The Malaysian Siamese predominantly profess Buddhism and the predominant form of Buddhism is Theravāda Buddhism which is centred in their place of worship called Wat. The Malaysian Siamese's lives are closely tied to their temples (Wat). Monks have a significant role in strengthening communities and encouraging villagers to participate in traditional Buddhist ceremonies and rituals on important religious days like (Uposatha Days, Magha Puja, Visakha Puja, Buddhist Lent (Vassa), and End of Buddhist Lent (Kathina)) to preserve the Siamese-Buddhist cultural identity. Most of them settled around temples and consider them as centers for holding religious ceremonies, cultural and social activities.

There also exists a small Thai-speaking Muslim minority called Samsam. However, the government has identified them under the Bumiputera (specifically Malay) category and most of them have already assimilated into the Malay populace, no longer identifying as Siamese.

Notable Malaysian Siamese people 

 Sultan Abdul Halim of Kedah, V & XIVth Yang di-Pertuan Agong of Malaysia (Malay-Siamese lineage)
 Tunku Abdul Rahman, Malaysia's first prime minister (royal Malay-Siamese lineage)
 Samransak Kram, Malaysian national footballer
 Manopsak Kram, Malaysian national footballer
 Hattaphon Bun An, Malaysian footballer
 Jupha Somnet, Malaysian national track cyclist
 Mon Redee Sut Txi, Malaysian national archer
 Saritha Cham Nong, compound archer and part of the Malaysian national team
 Mohd Ridzuan Abdunloh, Malaysian footballer
 Janna Nick, Malaysian actress and singer
 Nelydia Senrose, Malaysian actress (partial Siamese descent)
 Richard Rivalee, Malaysian fashion designer (of Sino-Thai heritage)
 Faezah Elai, Malaysian actress (partial Siamese descent)
 Bront Palarae, Malaysian actor (mixed Malay-Punjabi-Siamese heritage)

See also 
 Wat Buppharam, Penang
 Wat Chayamangkalaram, Penang
 Wat Chetawan, Selangor
 Wat Phothivihan, Kelantan
 Kampung Siam, Penang
 Thais in Singapore
 Thai Malays

References

Sources 

 
 

Ethnic groups in Malaysia
 
 
Thai diaspora in Asia
Immigration to Malaysia